Events in the year 1779 in France.

Incumbents
Monarch: Louis XVI

Events
12 April - Treaty of Aranjuez (1779)
June–September - Armada of 1779
2-4 July - Capture of Grenada (1779)
6 July - Battle of Grenada
6 October - Action of 6 October 1779

Births
7 October - Louis Charles, Count of Beaujolais, younger brother of King Louis-Philippe I of the French

Deaths

References 

1770s in France